The 1901 Vermont Green and Gold football team was an American football team that represented the University of Vermont during the 1901 college football season. In its first and only season under head coach P. J. McMahon the team compiled a 5–5–1 record and was outscored by a total of 171 to 146. The team played its home games at Athletic Park in Burlington, Vermont.

Schedule

References

Vermont
Vermont Catamounts football seasons
Vermont Catamounts football